MDIA may refer to:

mDia, or mammalian diaphanous, a Rho effector protein involved in cytoskeletal polymerisation (see DIAPH1)
Men's Division of Intercollegiate Associates, now called the Men's Collegiate Lacrosse Association